Radio Steiermark is the regional radio for Styria, and is part of the Österreich 2 group.
It is broadcast by the ORF, and the programs from Radio Steiermark are made in the ORF Steiermark Studio.

Frequencies 
The most important frequencies:

 Graz: 95.4 MHz
 Bruck/Mur: 93.2 MHz
 Neumarkt: 94.1 MHz
 Liezen: 96.8 MHz
 Schladming: 96.3 MHz
 Mitterbach: 92.8 MHz
 Murau: 96.8 MHz
 Mürzzuschlag: 94.5 MHz
 Knittelfeld: 94.9 MHz
 Eisenerz: 97.3 MHz
 Rechnitz: 100.1 MHz
 Leoben: 97.1 MHz

External links 
 

Radio stations in Austria
ORF (broadcaster)
Radio stations established in 1967
1967 establishments in Austria